Avdo is a Serbo-Croatian hypocorism of Abdullah found mainly in Bosnia and Herzegovina.

It may refer to:

 Avdo Humo (1914-1983), Bosnian communist politician
 Avdo Jabučica (died 1878), Ottoman Bosnian blacksmith
 Avdo Kalajdžić (born 1959), Bosnian football manager and former player
 Avdo Karabegović Hasanbegov (1878-1900), Bosnian poet
 S. Avdo Karabegović (1878-1908), Bosnian and Serbian poet
 Avdo Međedović (c. 1875–1955), gusle player and oral poet from Sandžak
 Avdo Spahić (born 1998), Bosnian-German footballer
 Avdo Sumbul (1884-1915), Serb Muslim editor and national activist
 Avdo Palić (1958-1995), Bosnian military officer

Given names
Masculine given names
Bosniak masculine given names
Bosnian masculine given names
Hypocorisms